Tyshon Dwayne Nobles (born October 27, 1990), better known by his stage name T-Wayne, is an American rapper from Houston, Texas. His rap name is a combination of his first name and his middle name. He has also occasionally taken the pseudonym Rickey Wayne, amid concerns that his name resembles those of famous rappers, T-Pain and Lil Wayne. He is best known for his 2015 single "Nasty Freestyle" which peaked at number nine on the US Billboard Hot 100. Born in Abilene, he moved to Dallas at age 15, then to Houston at 19, where he lives. He also performed at the 2015 BET Awards.

Breakthrough
On May 4, 2015, T-Wayne released his first single, "Nasty Freestyle". It peaked at number nine on the US Billboard Hot 100 in May 2015. The song also entered the UK Singles Chart at number 99, peaking at number 41. He also is dating a woman  named Heather Lynn

Discography

Mixtapes
 Who Is Rickey Wayne? (2015)
 Who Is Rickey Wayne 2 (2015)
 Forever Rickey (2017)

Singles

As lead artist

As featuring artist

References

1017 Brick Squad artists
African-American male rappers
Rappers from Houston
Southern hip hop musicians
Living people
1990 births
21st-century American rappers
21st-century American male musicians
People from Abilene, Texas
21st-century African-American musicians